Gossain or Gosain or Gussain or Gosyne is a Hindi word derived from   "lord of senses". It is used as a title in various Indian religious traditions.

These include:
 Gossains, a Hindu social group dealing with Vedas 
 A title given to members of the Shaiva sannyasin order of the Dashanami Sampradaya established by Shankaracharya (e.g. Gosain or Goswami Tulsidas).
 A title given to leaders of the Vaishnava order of the Vallabha.

See also
 Gaudiya Vaishnavism
Gosain, Indian surname
Goswami

References

Titles and occupations in Hinduism